Ondřej Lieser (born 12 August 1991) is a Czech professional golfer who plays on the European Tour. 

In 2020 he became the first golfer from the Czech Republic to win on the Challenge Tour with victory at the Andalucía Challenge de España, and the first Czech golfer to gain a full playing card on the European Tour.

He represented the Czech Republic at the 2020 Summer Olympics tournament but finished at the last place.

Amateur career
Lieser represented the Czech Republic at the 2012 Eisenhower Trophy.

Professional career
Lieser turned professional after the 2012 Eisenhower Trophy and made his professional debut at the D+D Real Czech Challenge on the Challenge Tour in October 2012, were he earned his first pay check after finishing tied 33rd.

Lieser played on the Pro Golf Tour where he won the Zell am See – Kaprun Open in 2018 and the Polish Open in 2019. He finished fifth on the 2019 Pro Golf Tour Order of Merit and earned a Challenge Tour card for 2020.

In 2020, Lieser finished tied for fourth place at the Italian Challenge Open Eneos Motor Oil in October before winning the Andalucía Challenge de España in Cadiz in November, two strokes ahead of Richard Mansell. With the victory, Lieser moved into sixth place on the Order of Merit and secured his spot in the season-ending Challenge Tour Grand Final. Lieser went on to win the Grand Final and by doing so; claimed the Order of Merit title, becoming the first Czech player to do so.

Professional wins (8)

Challenge Tour wins (2)

Pro Golf Tour wins (2)

Czech PGA Tour wins (4)

Team appearances
Amateur
Eisenhower Trophy (representing Czech Republic): 2012

References

External links

Ondřej Lieser at the Czech PGA Tour official site

Czech male golfers
European Tour golfers
Olympic golfers of the Czech Republic
Golfers at the 2020 Summer Olympics
Sportspeople from Prague
1991 births
Living people